CastleStorm is a 2013 game developed by Zen Studios released for Microsoft Windows, PlayStation 3, PlayStation 4, PlayStation Vita, Wii U, Xbox 360, and Xbox One. A remastered version called CastleStorm: Definitive Edition, as well as a free-to-play mobile version, CastleStorm: Free to Siege, was released in 2014. A sequel, CastleStorm 2  was released on the 31st July 2020.

Gameplay

CastleStorm is a side-scrolling physics-based real-time strategy game with tower defense elements. The player plays a number of characters obtained from completing separate game "campaigns", starting with the default character, Sir Gareth who is introduced in the first campaign, Kingdom Quest. There are four separate campaigns featured in the game, all set in slightly different points of time, with the last being, "The Warrior Queen".

Plot 

Sir Gareth is fighting Vikings and then lord Rufus betrays

Reception 
CastleStorm received "mixed or average" reviews, according to review aggregator Metacritic. It was praised for physics, visuals, and real-time strategy, but was criticized for a repetitive storyline and pointless missions. IGN called the game an "Angry Birds for those of us who like our projectile-based arcade games served not with cantankerous cardinals, but rather with enough braided Viking beards to put The Hobbit trilogy to shame". IGN made points such as slippery ballista controls.

Push Square stated the game was for those who liked multitasking.

Pinball adaptation
As the developer of the Zen Pinball series, Zen Studios also developed its own virtual pinball adaptation of CastleStorm and released it as part of the Iron and Steel pack for Zen Pinball 2, Pinball FX 2 and Pinball FX 3 in early 2015.  This table omits blood from the game due to censorship reasons and features 3-D animated figures of Sir Gareth and various Viking enemies, and is played entirely from Sir Gareth's perspective, with modes focusing on attack or defense against the Vikings, as well as celebrations in between battles.

References

2013 video games
IOS games
Fantasy video games
PlayStation 3 games
PlayStation 4 games
PlayStation Network games
PlayStation Vita games
Nintendo Switch games
Tower defense video games
Video games developed in Hungary
Video games featuring female protagonists
Video games set in castles
Wii U eShop games
Xbox 360 Live Arcade games
Xbox One games
Windows games
Embracer Group franchises
Zen Studios games
Multiplayer and single-player video games